Presidential elections were held in Peru in 1895. Nicolás de Piérola of the Democratic Party was elected unopposed.

Results

References

Presidential elections in Peru
Peru
1895 in Peru
Single-candidate elections
Election and referendum articles with incomplete results